Edward Franklin Albee III (March 12, 1928 – September 16, 2016) was an American playwright known for works such as The Zoo Story (1958), The Sandbox (1959), Who's Afraid of Virginia Woolf? (1962), A Delicate Balance (1966), and Three Tall Women (1994). Some critics have argued that some of his work constitutes an American variant of what Martin Esslin identified and named the Theater of the Absurd. Three of his plays won the Pulitzer Prize for Drama, and two of his other works won the Tony Award for Best Play.

His works are often considered frank examinations of the modern condition. His early works reflect a mastery and Americanization of the Theatre of the Absurd that found its peak in works by European playwrights such as Samuel Beckett, Eugène Ionesco, and Jean Genet.

His middle period comprised plays that explored the psychology of maturing, marriage, and sexual relationships. Younger American playwrights, such as Paula Vogel, credit Albee's mix of theatricality and biting dialogue with helping to reinvent postwar American theatre in the early 1960s. Later in life, Albee continued to experiment in works such as The Goat, or Who Is Sylvia? (2002).

Early life

Edward Albee was born in 1928. His biological father left his mother, Louise Harvey, and he was placed for adoption two weeks later and taken to Larchmont, New York, where he grew up. Albee's adoptive father, Reed A. Albee, the wealthy son of vaudeville magnate Edward Franklin Albee II, owned several theaters. His adoptive mother, Reed's second wife, Frances (Cotter), was a socialite. He later based the main character of his 1991 play Three Tall Women on his mother, with whom he had a conflicted relationship.

Albee attended the Rye Country Day School, then the Lawrenceville School in New Jersey, from which he was expelled. He then was sent to Valley Forge Military Academy in Wayne, Pennsylvania, where he was dismissed in less than a year. He enrolled at The Choate School (now Choate Rosemary Hall) in Wallingford, Connecticut, graduating in 1946.  He had attracted theatre attention by having scripted and published nine poems, eleven short stories, essays, a long act play, Schism, and a 500-page novel, The Flesh of Unbelievers (Horn, 1) in 1946. His formal education continued at Trinity College in Hartford, Connecticut, where he was expelled in 1947 for skipping classes and refusing to attend compulsory chapel.

Albee left home for good in his late teens. In a later interview, he said: "I never felt comfortable with the adoptive parents. I don't think they knew how to be parents. I probably didn't know how to be a son, either." In a 1994 interview, he said he left home at 18 because "[he] had to get out of that stultifying, suffocating environment." In 2008, he told interviewer Charlie Rose that he was "thrown out" because his parents wanted him to become a "corporate thug" and did not approve of his aspirations to be a writer.

Career

Albee moved into New York's Greenwich Village, where he supported himself with odd jobs while learning to write plays. Primarily in his early plays, Albee's work had various representations of the LGBTQIA community often challenging the image of a heterosexual marriage. Despite challenging society's views about the gay community, he did not view himself as an LGBT advocate. Albee's work typically criticized the American Dream. His first play, The Zoo Story, written in three weeks, was first staged in Berlin in 1959 before premiering Off-Broadway in 1960. His next, The Death of Bessie Smith, similarly premiered in Berlin before arriving in New York.

Albee's most iconic play, Who's Afraid of Virginia Woolf?, opened on Broadway at the Billy Rose Theatre on October 13, 1962, and closed on May 16, 1964, after five previews and 664 performances. The controversial play won the Tony Award for Best Play in 1963 and was selected for the 1963 Pulitzer Prize by the award's drama jury, but the selection was overruled by the advisory committee, which elected not to give a drama award at all. The two members of the jury, John Mason Brown and John Gassner, subsequently resigned in protest. An Academy Award-winning film adaptation by Ernest Lehman was released in 1966 starring Elizabeth Taylor, Richard Burton, George Segal, and Sandy Dennis, and was directed by Mike Nichols. In 2013, the film was selected for preservation in the United States National Film Registry by the Library of Congress as "culturally, historically, or aesthetically significant".

Georgia State University English professor Matthew Roudane divides Albee's plays into three periods: the Early Plays (1959–1966), characterized by gladiatorial confrontations, bloodied action and fight to the metaphorical death; the Middle Plays (1971–1987), when Albee lost favor of Broadway audience and started premiering in the U.S. regional theaters and in Europe; and the Later plays (1991–2016), received as a remarkable comeback and watched by appreciative audiences and critics the world over.

According to The New York Times, Albee was "widely considered to be the foremost American playwright of his generation."

The less-than-diligent student later dedicated much of his time to promoting American university theatre. He served as a distinguished professor at the University of Houston, where he taught playwriting. His plays are published by Dramatists Play Service and Samuel French, Inc.

Achievements and honors

A member of the Dramatists Guild Council, Albee received three Pulitzer Prizes for drama—for A Delicate Balance (1967), Seascape (1975), and Three Tall Women (1994).

Albee was elected a Fellow of the American Academy of Arts and Sciences in 1972. In 1985, Albee was inducted into the American Theatre Hall of Fame. In 1999, Albee received the PEN/Laura Pels Theater Award as a Master American Dramatist. He received a Special Tony Award for Lifetime Achievement (2005); the gold medal in Drama from the American Academy and Institute of Arts and Letters (1980); as well as the Kennedy Center Honors and the National Medal of Arts (both in 1996). In 2009, Albee received honorary degree from the Bulgarian National Academy of Theater and Film Arts (NATFA), a member of the Global Alliance of Theater Schools.

In 2008, in celebration of Albee's 80th birthday, a number of his plays were mounted in distinguished Off-Broadway venues, including the historic Cherry Lane Theatre where the playwright directed two of his early one-acts, The American Dream and The Sandbox.

Philanthropy
Albee established the Edward F. Albee Foundation, Inc. in 1967, from royalties from his play Who's Afraid of Virginia Woolf?. The foundation funds the William Flanagan Memorial Creative Persons Center (named after the composer William Flanagan, but better known as "The Barn") in Montauk, New York, as a residence for writers and visual artists.
The foundation's mission is "to serve writers and visual artists from all walks of life, by providing time and space in which to work without disturbance."

Personal life and death
Albee was gay and stated that he first knew he was gay at age 12 and a half.

As a teen in Larchmont, Albee became a close friend of English-born Muir Weissinger, Jr., and his family. Albee, along with others, referred to Florence, Muir's mother, as "Mummy." For her part, Albee's mother felt he spent too much time at the Weissinger household. Albee dated Muir's sister, Delphine, and escorted her to her coming-out party. Albee and Delphine had a "long and intense relationship" while it lasted; Albee has said they were "unofficially engaged." Albee kept in touch for a long time with Florence and Muir Weissinger.

Albee insisted that he did not want to be known as a "gay writer," saying in his acceptance speech for the 2011 Lambda Literary Foundation's Pioneer Award for Lifetime Achievement: "A writer who happens to be gay or lesbian must be able to transcend self. I am not a gay writer. I am a writer who happens to be gay." His longtime partner, Jonathan Richard Thomas, a sculptor, died on May 2, 2005 from bladder cancer. They had been partners from 1971 until Thomas's death. Albee also had a relationship of several years with playwright Terrence McNally during the 1950s.

Albee died at his home in Montauk, New York on September 16, 2016, aged 88.

Albee lived in a 6,000-square-foot loft that was a former cheese warehouse in New York's Tribeca neighborhood. At the time of his death Albee held an expansive collection of fine art, utilitarian works and sculptures.  Albee was especially interested in artworks created by indigenous cultures in Africa and Oceania.

Awards and nominations

Awards
 1960: Drama Desk Award Vernon Rice Award: The Zoo Story
 1963: Tony Award for Best Play: Who's Afraid of Virginia Woolf?
 1967: Pulitzer Prize for Drama: A Delicate Balance 
 1975: Pulitzer Prize for Drama: Seascape
 1994: Pulitzer Prize for Drama: Three Tall Women
 1995: St. Louis Literary Award from the Saint Louis University Library Associates
 1996: National Medal of Arts
 2002: Drama Desk Award Outstanding New Play: The Goat, or Who Is Sylvia?
 2002: Tony Award for Best Play: The Goat, or Who Is Sylvia?
 2003 Fitzgerald Award  Award for Achievement in American Literature award which is given annually in Rockville Maryland, the city where Fitzgerald, his wife, and his daughter are buried.
 2005: Special Tony Award for Lifetime Achievement
 2005: Academy of Achievement's Golden Plate Award
 2008: Drama Desk Award Special Award
 2011: Edward MacDowell Medal for Lifetime Achievement
 2011: Pioneer Award for Lifetime Achievement, Lambda Literary Foundation
 2013: Chicago Tribune Literary Prize
 2015: America Award in Literature

Nominations
 1964: Tony Award for Best Play: The Ballad of the Sad Cafe
 1965: Tony Award for Best Author of a Play: Tiny Alice
 1965: Tony Award for Best Play: Tiny Alice
 1967: Tony Award for Best Play: A Delicate Balance
 1975: Drama Desk Award Outstanding New Play: Seascape
 1975: Tony Award for Best Play: Seascape
 1976: Drama Desk Award Outstanding Director of a Play: Who's Afraid of Virginia Woolf?
 1994: Drama Desk Award Outstanding Play: Three Tall Women
 2001: Pulitzer Prize for Drama: The Play About the Baby
 2003: Pulitzer Prize for Drama: The Goat, or Who Is Sylvia?
 2005: Tony Award for Best Revival of a Play: Who's Afraid of Virginia Woolf?

Works

Plays 
Works written or adapted by Albee:

Adaptations

Opera libretti
 Bartleby (adapted from the short story by Herman Melville) (1961)
 The Ice Age (1963, uncompleted)

Essays 
Stretching My Mind: Essays 1960–2005 (Avalon Publishing, 2005). .

References
Edward Albee. Charlie Rose, 27 May 2008.

Further reading 
 Solomon, Rakesh H. Albee in Performance. Bloomington: Indiana University Press, 2010.

External links

Archives 
 Edward Albee scripts, 1949–1966, New York Public Library for the Performing Arts
 Edward Albee Plays  at the Newberry Library
 Robert A. Wilson collection, Special Collections, University of Delaware Library

Other links 
 Edward F. Albee Foundation
 The Edward Albee Society
 
 
 
 

1928 births
2016 deaths
20th-century American dramatists and playwrights
20th-century American male writers
21st-century American dramatists and playwrights
21st-century American male writers
Actors Studio alumni
American adoptees
American male dramatists and playwrights
American theatre directors
Choate Rosemary Hall alumni
Fellows of the American Academy of Arts and Sciences
American gay writers
Grammy Award winners
Kennedy Center honorees
American LGBT dramatists and playwrights
Gay dramatists and playwrights
LGBT people from New York (state)
LGBT people from Virginia
Members of the American Academy of Arts and Letters
People from Greenwich Village
People from Larchmont, New York
People from Tribeca
Pulitzer Prize for Drama winners
Rye Country Day School alumni
Theatre of the Absurd
Special Tony Award recipients
Tony Award winners
Trinity College (Connecticut) alumni
United States National Medal of Arts recipients
University of Houston faculty
Writers from New York (state)
Writers from Washington, D.C.
Fulbright alumni